Ramona Pagel (born Ramona Ebert, November 10, 1961 in Los Angeles) is a retired American shot putter. She made four consecutive Olympic teams, 1984-1996, four IAAF World Championships and won a full set of medals in three showings at the Pan American Games.  Her personal best put was 20.18 metres, achieved in June 1988 in San Diego. That mark was the American record for 25 years.  The record was tied 23 years later by Jillian Camarena-Williams in 2011 and was finally beaten by Michelle Carter at the 2013 USA Outdoor Track and Field Championships.  Two days before her record was beaten, Stamatia Scarvelis, coached by Pagel, won the Junior National Championship at the same meet.

Ramona attended Schurr High School in Montebello, California.  In 1979, she placed 3rd in CIF California State Meet, throwing the 8 Lb. Shot 47' 5¼".  Not only was that the third best in the competition, it was the third best in state history (in the 6 years that weight was thrown).  The weight was changed to 4 Kg the following year.

Her next school was Long Beach State, where she met and married UCLA and former Fullerton High School thrower Kent Pagel. He coached her throughout her career. She left LBSU in 1982 and transferred to San Diego State University, where she would ultimately complete her studies. Through her career, she was ranked in the top 10 American shot putters 16 years in a row, from 1981-1996, including the No. 1 ranking from 1985-1989. She also spent 8 years on the American Discus list, until back problems caused her to choose to focus on her best event.

Pagel also collects Pooh bear dolls.

International competitions

References

USATF bio

1961 births
Living people
Track and field athletes from Los Angeles
Sportspeople from Montebello, California
American female shot putters
Olympic track and field athletes of the United States
Athletes (track and field) at the 1984 Summer Olympics
Athletes (track and field) at the 1988 Summer Olympics
Athletes (track and field) at the 1992 Summer Olympics
Athletes (track and field) at the 1996 Summer Olympics
Pan American Games gold medalists for the United States
Pan American Games medalists in athletics (track and field)
Athletes (track and field) at the 1987 Pan American Games
Athletes (track and field) at the 1991 Pan American Games
Athletes (track and field) at the 1995 Pan American Games
World Athletics Championships athletes for the United States
San Diego State Aztecs women's track and field athletes
Pan American Games silver medalists for the United States
Pan American Games bronze medalists for the United States
Universiade medalists in athletics (track and field)
Universiade bronze medalists for the United States
Long Beach State Beach women's track and field athletes
Medalists at the 1987 Pan American Games
Medalists at the 1991 Pan American Games
Medalists at the 1995 Pan American Games